Agallidwipa is a genus of leafhopper from Madagascar

Species 
 Agallidwipa biramosa Viraktamath & Gonçalves, 2013
 Agallidwipa bispinosa Viraktamath & Gonçalves, 2013
 Agallidwipa pauliana (Evans, 1954)
 Agallidwipa webbi Viraktamath & Gonçalves, 2013

References 

Insects of Madagascar
Cicadellidae genera
Megophthalminae
Endemic fauna of Madagascar